Herennia Cupressenia Etruscilla was an Augusta and later regent of the Roman Empire, married to Emperor Decius, and mother of Emperors Herennius Etruscus and Hostilian. She served as regent of the Roman Empire during the reign of her son Hostilian in 251.

Life

As with most third-century Roman empresses, very little is known about her. She was probably from a senatorial family. It is assumed that her ancestors settled in Etrurian lands. Herennia married Decius probably before 230 and gained the title Augusta when Decius became emperor 249. When Decius and Herennius were defeated and killed in the Battle of Abrittus in 251, she became regent during the minority of her thirteen-year-old son Hostilian. Hostilian died of the plague later that year, thus ending her mandate as regent. She sank into obscurity after her sons perished.

While information about her is scarce, coins with her portrait are numerous and easy to obtain. Legends on coins struck at Rome only ever give her name as 'Herennia Etruscilla' but billon tetradrachms struck at Alexandria supply the Cupressenia element in abbreviation: ΕΡ ΚΟΥΠ ΑΙΤΡΟΥCΚΙΛΑ (Greek: Her. Koup. Aitrouskila), showing that her full name was Herennia Cup(ressenia) Etruscilla. The Cupressenia element is expanded from the 'ΚΟΥΠ' in the Alexandria coin legends, from the Latin cupresseus "cypress tree" and symbol of Juno.

See also
 Women in ancient Rome
 List of Roman women

References

External links
Statue of Herennia Cupressenia Etruscilla
Coins of Herennia Etruscilla

3rd-century Roman empresses
3rd-century viceregal rulers
Decian dynasty
Augustae
Etruscilla
3rd-century women rulers